Warriors is the first studio album by Yugoslav/Canadian heavy metal band Warriors, released in 1983. It is the band's first self-titled album, the second being their second (and last) album, released in 1984.

Background and recording
Warriors were formed in 1982 by vocalist Dušan Nikolić and drummer Miroslav "Vicko" Milatović. Milatović was at the time a member of highly successful band Riblja Čorba, Warriors being his side project. The first lineup of the band also featured guitarist Dragan Deletić, guitarist Zoran Konjević and bass guitarist Slobodan Svrdlan (a former member of the band Gordi). In 1983 this lineup of the band released the EP entitled Warriors – Ratnici, after which Milatović had to leave the band due to his  mandatory stint in the Yugoslav People's Army, and soon after Canadian guitarist Douglass Platt replaced Deletić. The band recorded their debut album with drummer Tom Martin (a former member of the band Izazov), who was, however, not credited as an official band member. The album was recorded during July and August 1983 in Radio Television Belgrade Studio V and produced by band members themselves.

Track listing
All songs credited to Warriors.

Personnel
Dušan Nikolić - vocals
Douglas Platt - guitar
Zoran Konjević - guitar
Slobodan Svrdlan - bass guitar

Additional personnel
Tom Martin - drums
Sloba Marković - keyboards
Predrag Jakovljević - percussion
Dragan Vukiċević - engineer, backing vocals (on track 9)
Zoran Blažina - artwork, graphic design
Marko Bralić - photography

Legacy
In 2015 Warriors album cover, designed by Zoran Blažina, was ranked 33rd on the list of 100 Greatest Album Covers of Yugoslav Rock by web magazine Balkanrock.

References

Warriors at Discogs

External links
Warriors at Discogs

Warriors (band) albums
1983 debut albums
PGP-RTB albums